Adnan Catic (born 15 January 2000) is a Swedish footballer who plays for Örebro Syrianska IF.

He made his Allsvenskan debut for AFC Eskilstuna in 2019. In the summer of 2020 he moved to Östersunds FK, but after a loan to Ljungskile SK he was released at the end of 2020.

References

External links
 

2000 births
Living people
Association football defenders
Swedish footballers
BK Forward players
AFC Eskilstuna players
Ljungskile SK players
Ettan Fotboll players
Allsvenskan players
Superettan players